Ardscotnish, also known as Ardskeodnish, is a former location, in Argyll and Bute, Scotland approximating to the present parish of Kilmartin.

Argyll and Bute